Wolf Matthias Friedrich is a classical singer of baritone and bass roles, especially of Early music and Baroque music.

Friedrich studied at the Musikhochschule Leipzig. In 1980, he was the winner of the International Dvorák Competition in Karlovy Vary. From 1982 to 1986 Friedrich was a member of the Opera Studio of the Dresden State Opera. The bass has made guest appearances at the Dresden Music Festival, the Handel Festival in Halle, the Schwetzingen Festival as well as in Berlin, Hanover, Potsdam, Edinburgh and Australia. In 2000, he performed the role of Pluto in the first modern revival of Giovanni Legrenzi's La divisione del mondo at the Schwetzingen Festival. He has focused on Baroque operas. He has often collaborated with the conductor Alessandro De Marchi. In 2002/03, he appeared as Licomede in Handel's Deidamia at the Handel Festival in Halle, conducted by De Marchi. He worked with Norman Shetler in various lied projects, including Franz Schubert, Felix Mendelssohn and Carl Loewe). His recordings have included Schubert’s Schwanengesang. He works regularly with the ensembles Musica Fiata and Cantus Cölln, also as a member of Cantus Cölln. In 2002, Friedrich was one of the co-founders of the Kerll-Rosenmüller Festival, which was held annually from 2002 to 2006 to promote the musical heritage of the Baroque composers Johann Caspar Kerll, Johann Rosenmüller and Sebastian Knüpfer.

Opera productions
Source:

 Monteverdi: L'incoronazione di Poppea (Cologne Opera)
 Monteverdi: L'Orfeo (Brisbane, Sydney, Melbourne)
 Monteverdi: Il ritorno d'Ulisse in patria (Cologne)
 Peranda/Bontempi: Dafne (Dresdner Musikfestspiele)
 Legrenzi: La divisione del mondo (Schwetzingen Festival)
 Steffani: Orlando (Hannover Herrenhausen)
 Handel: Deidamia, Semele (Halle)
 Handel: Aci, Galatea e Polifemo (Potsdam)
 Handel: Orlando (Göttingen, Drottningholm, Berlin, New York, Tanglewood)
 Handel: Admeto (Göttingen, Edinburgh)
 Handel: Rinaldo (Cologne, Prague)
 Handel: Alcina (Cologne, Wiesbaden)
 Haydn: Armida (Schwetzingen)
 Mozart: Le nozze di Figaro (Hannover Herrenhausen, Wiesbaden)
 Mozart: Cosi fan tutte (Wiesbaden)
 Mozart: La clemenza di Tito (Prague)
 Mozart: Entführung aus dem Serail (Potsdam, Cologne, Wiesbaden)
 Mozart: Don Giovanni (Cologne)
 Mussorgski: Boris Godunow (Wiesbaden)
 Cimarosa: Il matrimonio segreto (Dresden)
 Weill: Aufstieg und Fall der Stadt Mahagonny (Cologne)
 Rossini: L'italiana in Algeri (Cologne)
 Matthus: Cornet (Dresden)
 Shih: Vatermord (Dresden Hellerau)
 Tschaikowski: Eugene Onegin
 Zimmermann: Weiße Rose (Schwerin).

References

External links 
 
 Wolf Matthias Friedrich (Bass-Baritone) Bach Cantatas Website
 Bach cantatas with Wolf Matthias Friedrich as bass soloist on bachipedia.org (videos included, since 2007)

German operatic baritones
German operatic basses
Year of birth missing (living people)
Living people